Marshall railway station is located on the Warrnambool line in Victoria, Australia. It serves the southern Geelong suburb of Marshall, and opened on 26 April 2005.

A previous station on the site, called Connewarre, opened on 14 July 1879, and was renamed Marshall on 1 April 1907. That station was closed to passengers on 14 October 1957, and the platform had been removed by 22 July 1958. The station was closed to all traffic on 17 February 1964.

During the 2002 Victorian State Election, the State Government announced that a new station would be provided in the vicinity to serve the rapidly expanding southernmost suburbs of Geelong. During the planning stages, the station was named Grovedale. In December 2003, it was announced that the new station would be built adjacent to the Marshalltown Road level crossing, on the site of the former Marshall station. Following a naming competition, it was revealed in September 2004 that the new station would be called Marshall.

The new station opened on 26 April 2005, and was initially served by Warrnambool line trains only. From September 2005, Geelong line services were extended from South Geelong, and Marshall became the terminus for most Geelong-line trains. Following its opening in October 2014, Waurn Ponds station became the terminus for the majority of Geelong line services.

As part of the Regional Rail Revival project, a new station building will be constructed, incorporating an upgraded waiting room and forecourt, and a second platform will be provided, the platforms being by a pedestrian overpass. There will also be more car parking spaces, an upgraded bus interchange, and improvements to lighting and CCTV coverage. As part of the works, the line between Waurn Ponds and South Geelong will be duplicated, with the exception of the two-kilometre section of track across the Barwon River flood plain. 

The former Geelong Racecourse station was located between Marshall and South Geelong.

Platforms and services
Marshall has one platform. It is served by V/Line Geelong line and selected Warrnambool line trains.

Platform 1:
 services to Waurn Ponds and Southern Cross
 weekday evening and two weekend services to Warrnambool and Southern Cross

Transport links
McHarry's Buslines operates four routes via Marshall station, under contract to Public Transport Victoria:
: Geelong station – Deakin University Waurn Ponds Campus
: Geelong station – Jan Juc
: Geelong station – Jan Juc
: Geelong station – Ocean Grove

References

External links
Marshall Victoria Railway Stations gallery

Railway stations in Geelong
Railway stations in Australia opened in 1879
Regional railway stations in Victoria (Australia)